The Riada Stadium is a purpose-built sports facility in Ballymoney, County Antrim, Northern Ireland. The football teams Glebe Rangers and Ballymoney United share the stadium.

References 

Association football venues in County Antrim
Ballymoney